In mathematics, a semialgebraic set is a finite union of sets defined by polynomial equalities and polynomial inequalities.
A semialgebraic function is a function with a semialgebraic graph. Such sets and functions are mainly studied in real algebraic geometry which is the appropriate framework for algebraic geometry over the real numbers.

Definition
Let  be a real closed field. (For example  could be the field of real numbers .)

Properties

Similarly to algebraic subvarieties, finite unions and intersections of semialgebraic sets are still semialgebraic sets. Furthermore, unlike subvarieties, the complement of a semialgebraic set is again semialgebraic. Finally, and most importantly, the Tarski–Seidenberg theorem says that they are also closed under the projection operation: in other words a semialgebraic set projected onto a linear subspace yields another semialgebraic set (as is the case for quantifier elimination).  These properties together mean that semialgebraic sets form an o-minimal structure on R.

A semialgebraic set (or function) is said to be defined over a subring A of R if there is some description as in the definition, where the polynomials can be chosen to have coefficients in A.

On a dense open subset of the semialgebraic set S, it  is (locally) a submanifold. One can define the dimension of S to be the largest dimension at points at which it is a submanifold. It is not hard to see that a semialgebraic set lies inside an algebraic subvariety of the same dimension.

See also
Łojasiewicz inequality 
Existential theory of the reals
Subanalytic set
piecewise algebraic space

References
.
.
.

External links
PlanetMath page

Real algebraic geometry